Marie-Georges (or Marie-George) is a French feminine given name. Notable people with the name include:

Marie-Georges Pascal, French actress (1946–1985)
Marie-George Buffet, French politician (born 1949)

Compound given names
French feminine given names